"Bob Dylan's Blues" is a song written and performed by the American singer-songwriter Bob Dylan, that was first released as the fifth track on his 1963 album, The Freewheelin' Bob Dylan.

Recording sessions
"Bob Dylan's Blues" was recorded on July 9, 1962, during the third Freewheelin''' session. Dylan recorded several new compositions that day, including "Blowin' in the Wind", a song he had already performed live but had yet to record in the studio. Other tracks recorded during the session included "Down the Highway," and "Honey, Just Allow Me One More Chance". Master takes of the four songs were selected and set aside for the final album.

Dylan later recorded the song as a demo for his music publisher, M. Witmark & Sons. This version, taped in April 1963 at Witmark's studio, was officially released in October 2010 on The Bootleg Series Vol. 9 – The Witmark Demos: 1962–1964''.

References

External links
 Lyrics at Bob Dylan's official website

1963 songs
Songs written by Bob Dylan
Bob Dylan songs
American folk rock songs
Blues rock songs